Borče Domlevski (born May 17, 1975) is a Macedonian professional basketball Power forward who last played for Polo Trejd.

References

External links
 

1975 births
Living people
Macedonian men's basketball players
Power forwards (basketball)
Place of birth missing (living people)